Senator Lent may refer to:

Abraham Lent (New York politician) (1815–1882), New York State Senate
Berkeley Lent (1921–2007), Oregon State Senate
Dave Lent (fl. 1990s–2010s), Idaho State Senate
Norman F. Lent (1931–2012), New York State Senate